"The Night Santa Went Crazy" is an original song performed by "Weird Al" Yankovic. The black comedy Christmas song is performed as a pastiche of "Black Gold" by Soul Asylum. It has melodic references to "Black Gold", "Mama, I'm Coming Home" by Ozzy Osbourne, and "I Believe in Father Christmas" by Greg Lake.

It is the twelfth and final track on the album Bad Hair Day, released as a single during the 1996 Christmas season. "The Night Santa Went Crazy" is on the compilation album The Essential "Weird Al" Yankovic. Both albums have received positive critical reviews.

Lyrics
The song starts with Santa's elves making Christmas presents for good, "Gentile" children. Suddenly, a drunken Santa bursts in with a rifle in his hand, and covered with ammunition "like a big, fat, drunk, disgruntled Yuletide Rambo". He says, "Merry Christmas to all, now you're all gonna die!" He proceeds to destroy half of the North Pole, hold the elves and helpers hostage, and kill most of his reindeer in various graphic, sadistic ways. The National Guard and FBI come to restore order. 

The song's epilogue has two different versions, with one version being called the "Extra Gory Version". In the original epilogue, the singer explains to Virginia that Santa was arrested and locked up in a federal prison, with the possibility of release for "good behavior in 700 more years." Meanwhile, the two surviving reindeer are coping with post-traumatic stress disorder, the elves get jobs working for the postal service, and Mrs. Claus negotiates film rights for the incident. In the Extra Gory Version of the song, the singer explains that Santa Claus is dead, as he was shot in the head by "some guy from the swat team", and that the children weren't getting any more presents while the elves had to "stand in line to file for unemployment." The singer surmises that Santa Claus had grown tired of only receiving milk and cookies for his work, concluded he was getting "gypped", and went postal because of it.

Music Video
An official music video for this song was made by TJ Morris. It parodied Rankin/Bass stop motion animation and recreates the lyrics of the song in graphic detail. The most noticeable difference between the lyrics and the events of the music video is that the epilogue has the Easter Bunny smuggle a metal file to Santa, allowing Santa to escape from prison.

Release
"The Night Santa Went Crazy" was released as the third and final single from Bad Hair Day on November 26, 1996; the CD single features "The Night Santa Went Crazy" and "Christmas at Ground Zero", another holiday-themed song from Yankovic's 1986 album Polka Party!. The cover art displays the original drawing of Santa Claus by Mark Osborne that inspired Yankovic to write the song. Though the single did not chart upon original release, it later peaked at number 35 on the United States Billboard Holiday Digital Tracks chart in 2010.

An "extra gory" version of the song was included as the third track on the "Amish Paradise" single. In this version, Vixen and Donner are not mentioned (leaving their fate ambiguous), Santa is killed by a member of the SWAT team, and the elves file for unemployment benefits. Another rendition combining elements of the album and the "extra gory" versions was written for Yankovic's Touring with Scissors tour in 1999; it is featured on the "Weird Al" Yankovic Live! video album. He later performed "The Night Santa Went Crazy" on the television variety show Penn & Teller's Sin City Spectacular.

The "Extra Gory" version is on the compilation album The Essential "Weird Al" Yankovic, and on the album Medium Rarities.

Track listing
 CD single
 "The Night Santa Went Crazy" – 4:03
 "Christmas at Ground Zero" – 3:07

Personnel
These credits are adapted from Bad Hair Day liner notes.

 "Weird Al" Yankovic – arrangement, keyboards, vocals, production
 Bernie Grundman – mastering
 Steve Jay – bass, background vocals
 Tony Papa – engineering, mixing

 Colin Sauers – additional engineering
 Jon "Bermuda" Schwartz – percussion, drums
 Rubén Valtierra – keyboards
 Jim West – guitar, background vocals

Charts

See also
Bad Hair Day
The Essential "Weird Al" Yankovic
"Christmas at Ground Zero"
"Father Christmas"

References

Songs about Santa Claus
1996 singles
"Weird Al" Yankovic songs
Songs written by "Weird Al" Yankovic
American Christmas songs
Black comedy music
Christmas novelty songs
1996 songs
Scotti Brothers Records singles